The 2017 FIL Women's Lacrosse World Cup, the tenth World Cup, is the preeminent international women's lacrosse tournament. The tournament is being held at the Surrey Sports Park in Guildford, Surrey, in the South East of England, with 25 nations competing. Rathbones Investment Management plc committed as the title sponsor for the event in 2014.

Introduction
The 2017 Rathbones Women's Lacrosse World Cup is an official Federation of International Lacrosse (FIL) event and will be organised and managed by the English Lacrosse Association. This tournament was first held in 1982 and is held every four years. This will be the third time that England has hosted the World Cup having previously hosted the tournament in 1982 and 2001.

Participating nations

Format
The seeding structure for the FIL Rathbones Women’s Lacrosse World Cup has been calculated through use of placing positions from the 2013 World Cup in Canada. Nations who are playing in the World Cup for the first time were placed based on previous results, geographic diversity and their 2016 European Championship placing position.

The pools played a round robin between 12 and 18 July. The top placing teams from Pools B, C, D and E will play off to decide which 2 nations qualify to play in the Championship Division. Pool A members all advance to the Championship Division because it is composed of the top teams, according to World Lacrosse.

The nations were split up to play in the Championship Division (Teams 1-8), Platinum Division (Teams 9-16) and Diamond Division (Teams 17-25).

Group stage

Pool A

Pool B

Pool C

Pool D

Pool E

Championship Division

Consolation bracket

Platinum Division
Platinum Division will define positions 9 to 16.

Consolation bracket

Diamond Division
Diamond Division will define positions 17 to 25.

Consolation bracket

†Loser of game places 25th

Final ranking

References

External links 
 The 2017 FIL Women's World Cup web site
 Surrey Sports Park

2017 Women's
2017 in lacrosse
2017
2017 Women's Lacrosse
Sport in Guildford
Lacrosse World Cup
Women's lacrosse in the United Kingdom